"Innamoratissimo (Tu che fai battere forte il mio cuore)" is a song by the Italian Italo disco duo Righeira, released in 1986 as the second single from their second album, Bambini Forever (1986). The song was co-written by Johnson Righeira, Michael Righeira, Carmelo La Bionda, Michelangelo La Bionda, Sergio Conforti and Cristiano Minellono, and produced by La Bionda. 

The song was performed at the Sanremo Music Festival in February 1986, at which it was first brought to fame. However, the song ended up in fifteenth place out of 22 competing performances in the Big Artists section after the final voting. "Innamoratissimo" was targeted by critics, but the duo were praised after their performance, regarding their lack of knowledge in staging big performances.

Release 

The original version of "Innamoratissimo" was released early in 1986 on the CGD label and featured "Gli parlerò di te" as the B-side, which was featured on the A-side of Righeira's debut album Righeira, released in September 1983. By April 1986, "Innamoratissimo" had become a popular single in Italy. CGD issued Bambini Forever on 23 June 1986 with "Innamoratissimo" sequenced as the tenth track, following Rota's "Adelante". In West Germany, "Innamoratissimo" was released on the Teldec label as a 12-inch single and featured "Innamoratissimo (The In Crowd Mix)", the same version as on Bambini Forever, as the A-side.

Cover versions 

In 2014, Italian singer Syria did a pop take on the song, that was included on her tenth studio album Syria 10.

Track listing and formats 

 Italian 7-inch single

A. "Innamoratissimo (Tu che fai battere forte il mio cuore)" – 4:00
B. "Gli parlerò di te" – 4:18

 German 7-inch single

A. "Innamoratissimo (Tu che fai battere forte il mio cuore)" – 3:50
B. "Gli parlerò di te" – 4:18

 German 12-inch maxi-single

A. "Innamoratissimo" (The 'In-Crowd' Mix) – 5:43
B. "Innamoratissimo" (X-Tended Version) – 5:31

Credits and personnel 

 Johnson Righeira – songwriter, vocals
 Michael Righeira – songwriter, vocals
 Carmelo La Bionda – songwriter, producer
 Michelangelo La Bionda – songwriter, producer
 Sergio Conforti – songwriter, programming
 Cristiano Minellono – songwriter
 Uli Rudolf – engineering, mixing
 Luca Orioli – programming
 Matteo Fasolino – programming
 Marco Inzadi – mastering

Credits and personnel adapted from the Bambini Forever album and 7-inch single liner notes.

Charts

Weekly charts

References

Sources

External links 

 

1980s ballads
1986 songs
1986 singles
Compagnia Generale del Disco singles
Italian-language songs
Righeira songs
Song recordings produced by La Bionda
Songs written by Cristiano Minellono
Songs written by Johnson Righeira
Songs written by Michael Righeira